From Vegas to Macau II is a 2015 3D Hong Kong-Chinese action comedy film directed and written by Wong Jing and starring Chow Yun-fat, Nick Cheung, Carina Lau, Shawn Yue, Angela Wang and Michelle Hu. The film is the sequel to From Vegas to Macau. The third installment of the series, From Vegas to Macau III was released on February 8, 2016.

Cast
Chow Yun-fat as Ken / Ko Chun
Nick Cheung as Mark
Carina Lau as Molly
Shawn Yue as Vincent
Angela Wang as Yan, Mark's daughter
Michelle Hu as Purple, Aoi's assassin
David Chiang as Victor
Kimmy Tong as Rainbow
Philip Keung as Ma Tai-fat
Wu Yue as Aoi's enforcer that fought Vincent
Jin Qiaoqiao as Aoi
Kenny Wong as Ben, Interpol police
Derek Tsang as Interpol police
Connie Man as Jackie, Interpol police
Rebecca Zhu as Interpol police
Samantha Ko as Aoi's enforcer
Jacky Cai as Aoi's enforcer that fought Mark
Ken Lo as Muay Thai Champ Rymi
Treechada Petcharat as Thai casino boss
Candy Chang as Aoi's enforcer with a crossbow
Bella Lo as Victor's daughter
Julio Acconci as Do Min-shui, Molly's companion
Hazel Tong as Interpol police
Dominic Ho as Interpol police
Wang Zizi as Aoi's enforcer that fought Mark
Jolie Fan as casino dealer for Victor's charity

Guest stars and cameos
Yuan Quan as Mark's wife
Natalie Meng as mahjong cheater
Eric Tsang as Yen Ji-dan
Natalis Chan as Champ
Wong Jing as Smartie (uncredited)
Felix Lok as Mr. Hon
Aman Chang as Jiang
Andy Lau as Michael "Little Knife" Chan from God of Gamblers

Critical response
James Marsh of the British magazine Screen International gave the film a negative review, writing, "The result is a noticeable step down in quality from last year's offering" and "Much of the comedy throughout the film also falls flat."

Box office
As of March 2015 the film has grossed US$157 million in China.

The film opened at No. 2 at the Chinese box office behind Dragon Blade earning US$29 million in its opening weekend ($43.1 million from Thursday to Sunday) which is higher than its predecessor's opening weekend gross. It topped the box office in its second weekend with US$69.8 million (up 58%). In its third weekend, the film fell to No. 2 earning US$27.4 million while Hollywood's animated film, Big Hero 6 took the top spot.

References

External links
 

 

2015 films
Films directed by Wong Jing
Chinese 3D films
2015 3D films
Hong Kong 3D films
Films set in Shenzhen
Chinese action comedy films
Chinese sequel films